The Scoto-Norman surname Sinclair comes from the Clan Sinclair, whose progenitors moved to Scotland and were given the land of Roslin, Midlothian by the King of Scots.

The style "Sinclair" is the most common. It has its origins in Scotland and is a derivation of the original French de Saint-Clair, although the name has also been styled "Santoclair", "de St. Clair", "Sainclair", "Synklar" and many more across the centuries. The well-known individuals in this article are listed first alphabetically then by profession.

A
Adam Sinclair, hockey player
Adam Sinclair (actor), actor
Adelaide Sinclair, Canadian civil servant
Aishah Sinclair, Malaysian actress and TV host
Alex Sinclair, colorist for comics
Alfred Sinclair, born Alfred Sinclair Wadham, English painter in Australia
Alfredo Sinclair, Panamanian artist
Alice Sinclair, British supermodel
Alison Sinclair (disambiguation)
Alistair Sinclair, Scottish curler, European champion
Anders Sinclair, Scottish mercenary in Sweden
Andrew Sinclair (disambiguation)
Anne Sinclair, French TV-personality and wife of Dominique Strauss-Kahn
Archibald Sinclair (journalist) (1866–1922), British sports journalist
Archibald Sinclair, 1st Viscount Thurso, Scottish politician and leader of the British Liberal Party
Arthur St. Clair, early American general and President of the Continental Congress
Arthur Sinclair, early American naval hero
Ashraf Sinclair, Malaysian actor
Augustus Sinclair, fictional character from BioShock 2.

B
Baron Sinclair of Cleeve, businessman, civil servant
Barry Sinclair, New Zealand Test cricketer
Belinda Sinclair, British actress
Brett Sinclair, fictional character in The Persuaders! TV series
Brian Sinclair (veterinary surgeon), veterinary surgeon
Bob Sinclair (disambiguation)
Bruce Sinclair (disambiguation)

C
Cam Sinclair, motocross rider
Cameron Sinclair, architect
Carl St.Clair, Music director, conductor
Catherine Sinclair, author
Cecile Sinclair, Dutch glamour model
Charles Sinclair (disambiguation)
Christine Sinclair (born 1983), Canadian soccer player
Christopher A. Sinclair, CEO of Mattel and Pepsi-Cola
Sir Clive Sinclair (1940–2021), founder of Sinclair Research Ltd
Clive Sinclair (author)

D
Dave Sinclair, British musician with the band Caravan
David Sinclair (disambiguation), multiple people
Des Sinclair, South Africa international rugby union player
Donald Sinclair (hotel owner) (1909–1981), owner of the Gleneagles Hotel in Torquay, England; inspiration for the character Basil Fawlty, played by John Cleese, in the British television sitcom Fawlty Towers
Donald Sinclair (veterinary surgeon) (1911–1995), British veterinary surgeon, inspiration for a character in the All Creatures Great and Small franchise
Drake Sinclair, fictional character in The Sixth Gun comic series

E
Edward Sinclair (disambiguation)
Edwyn Alexander-Sinclair, Royal Navy officer
Elliot Sinclair, fictional character
Emile Sinclair, English professional footballer
Emma Sinclair, British businesswoman and entrepreneur
Enid Sinclair, fictional character
Eon Sinclair, musician
Eric Sinclair, Scottish footballer

F
Frank Sinclair, footballer

G
George Sinclair (disambiguation)
Gerard Sinclair, solicitor
Gord Sinclair, musician
Gordon Sinclair, Canadian journalist, writer and commentator
Graeme Sinclair, Scottish footballer
Grayson Sinclair, fictional character

H
Harry Sinclair, New Zealand actor
Harry F. Sinclair, founder of Sinclair Oil
Heather Sinclair, unseen character in Degrassi: The Next Generation
Helen Sinclair, fictional character from Doctor Who audios
Henry Sinclair, Earl of Orkney
Henry John Sinclair, 2nd Baron Pentland
Admiral Hugh Sinclair, director of British Naval Intelligence, helped to set up MI6
Holly J. Sinclair, fictional character in Degrassi: The Next Generation
Hugh Macdonald Sinclair, British nutrition researcher

I
Iain Sinclair, British writer and filmmaker
Ian Sinclair, Australian politician
Ian Sinclair (cricketer), New Zealand Test cricketer
Ian David Sinclair, Canadian lawyer, businessman, and Senator
Izzy Sinclair, fictional character from Doctor Who comic

J
Jack Sinclair (Scouting)
James Sinclair (disambiguation)
Jamie Sinclair (born 1992), American curler
Jean de Saint-Clair, alleged sixth Grand Master of the Priory of Sion
Jeffrey Sinclair, fictional character on the television show Babylon 5
Jess Sinclair, Australian rules footballer
Jim Sinclair (activist), autism rights activist
Jimmy Sinclair (1876–1913), South African cricketer
Sir John Sinclair, 1st Baronet (1754–1835), politician, writer finance and agriculture
John Sinclair, 3rd Viscount Thurso (born 1953), Scottish businessman and politician
John Sinclair (bishop) (died 1566)
John Sinclair (musician) (born 1952), keyboardist with Uriah Heep
John Sinclair (poet) (born 1941), American writer and activist
John Sinclair (British Army officer), head of Military Intelligence
John Gordon Sinclair, Scottish actor
John McHardy Sinclair, Professor of Modern English Language at Birmingham University
John Mitchell Sinclair, South Australian shipping agent and politician 
Julyan Sinclair, television and radio presenter

K
Karen Sinclair, Welsh politician
Kenia Sinclair, Jamaican athlete
Kim Sinclair (born 1954), New Zealand set decorator

L
Laurent Sinclair, stage name of Laurent Biehler, French musician
Linnea Sinclair, American science fiction romance author
Lister Sinclair, Scottish/Canadian broadcaster, playwright and polymath
Lucas Sinclair, fictional character from Stranger Things
Luke Sinclair, the criminal Sinclair, played by Chris Sarandon in the film "Reaper"

M
Madge Sinclair, Emmy-winning actress
Madison Sinclair, fictional character
Malcolm St. Clair (filmmaker), Laurel & Hardy collaborator and prolific filmmaker
Malcolm Sinclair (disambiguation)
Marie de Saint-Clair, alleged second Grand Master of the Priory of Sion
Sister Margaret Sinclair, Scottish nun and former factory worker, declared 'venerable' by Pope Paul VI in 1978
Margaret Sinclair (later Margaret Trudeau), former wife of the late Pierre Trudeau, the 15th Prime Minister of Canada
Mark Sinclair, American actor, better known by his stage name of Vin Diesel
Mathew Sinclair, New Zealand cricketer
May Sinclair, British novelist
Maynard Sinclair, Deputy Prime Minister of Northern Ireland
Michael Sinclair (disambiguation)
Michelle Anne Sinclair, adult-film actress also known by her screen-name "Belladonna"
Murray Sinclair, Manitoba judge
Malcolm Sinclair (Swedish nobleman) (1690–1739), Swedish officer killed by Russians fuelling the start of the Russo–Swedish War (1741–1743)

N
Nigel Sinclair, Scottish producer of Hollywood films
Nick Sinclair, photographer

O
Olga Sinclair, artist and daughter of Alfredo Sinclair

P
Perdita Hyde-Sinclair, fictional character
Peter Sinclair (disambiguation)

R
Rebecca Sinclair (author), author
Rebecca Sinclair (snowboarder), Olympic snowboarder
Richard St. Clair, U.S. composer, pianist, and poet
Robert Sinclair (bishop), fourteenth century Scottish bishop
Robert Sinclair (locomotive engineer)
 Ronnie L. Sinclair (author) 
Rosemary Sinclair, fictional character
Roy Sinclair (curler), former Scottish curler and past president of World Curling Federation
Ryan Sinclair, fictional character from Doctor Who

S
Sadie Sinclair, fictional character
Scott Sinclair, footballer
Skylar Sinclair, fictional character in The Saboteur video game
Suzanne Sinclair (New Zealand politician)

T
Tim Sinclair, poet, novelist
Trevor Sinclair, footballer

U
Upton Sinclair, novelist

V
Victoria Sinclair, anchorwoman on Naked News

W
William Sinclair (disambiguation)
William Sinclair-Burgess, Australian Army Major General in World War I
William Sinclair (Archdeacon of London), Archdeacon of London

Disambiguation pages
Instances of more than one person with the same name:
Alison Sinclair (disambiguation)
Andrew Sinclair (disambiguation)
Bob Sinclair (disambiguation)
Charles Sinclair (disambiguation)
David Sinclair (disambiguation)
Donald Sinclair (disambiguation)
Edward Sinclair (disambiguation)
George Sinclair (disambiguation)
Ian Sinclair (disambiguation)
James Sinclair (disambiguation)
John Sinclair (disambiguation)
Malcolm Sinclair (disambiguation)
Michael Sinclair (disambiguation)
Peter Sinclair (disambiguation)
William Sinclair (disambiguation)

See also
Clan Sinclair
Saint Clair (disambiguation)
Saint Clare (disambiguation)
Santa Clara (disambiguation)

References

English-language surnames
Scottish surnames
Surnames of Norman origin
Anglicised Scottish Gaelic-language surnames
Americanized surnames

fr:Famille Saint-Clair